Poza or Pozas may refer to:

Geography
 Poza Rica, city in Veracruz, Mexico
 C.D. Poza Rica, football team in Poza Rica
 Poza de la Sal, town in Castille and León, Spain
 Poza de la Vega, municipality in Castille and León, Spain
 Pozas, Ciales, Puerto Rico, barrio in Ciales, Puerto Rico
 Pozas, San Sebastián, Puerto Rico, barrio in San Sebastián, Puerto Rico
 Pozas Formation, geologic formation in Puerto Rico

People
 Francisco Javier Pozas (born 1964), Mexican wrestler known as Pantera
 Gerado Campos Poza (born 1978), Mexican wrestler known as Último Gladiador
 Jéssica Miroslava Eterovic Pozas, Chilean delegate for Miss World 1993
 Jorge Poza (born 1976), Mexican actor
 Nathalie Poza (born 1972), Spanish actress
 Ricardo Pozas Arciniega (1912–1994), Mexican anthropologist
 Sebastián Pozas Perea (1876–1946), Spanish military officer

Other uses
 Las Pozas, a garden near Xilitla, Mexico
 Alan Poza, Nigerian romantic comedy film
 Poza prawem, album by The Analogs

See also
 Posa (disambiguation)